The following is the current leaderboard for career wins in KBO League Korean baseball.

Players with 100 or more wins
 Stats updated as of October 12, 2022.

See also
 List of KBO career strikeout leaders
 List of KBO career saves leaders
 List of Major League Baseball career strikeout leaders

References

Korean baseball articles
KBO career win leaders